Darling of the King is a 1924 German silent film directed by Heinz Schall and starring Ruth Weyher, Elisabeth Pinajeff and Bruno Kastner.

The film's sets were designed by the art director Hermann Warm and Gustav A. Knauer.

Cast
 Ruth Weyher
 Elisabeth Pinajeff
 Bruno Kastner
 Robert Scholz
 Hans Junkermann
 Julia Serda
 Erich Kaiser-Titz
 Sophie Pagay
 Paula Eberty
 Philipp Manning
 Lantelme Dürer
 Hermann Picha
 Lydia Potechina
 Hermann Vallentin
 Hugo Döblin
 Luigi Serventi
 Joseph Klein

References

Bibliography
 Bock, Hans-Michael & Bergfelder, Tim. The Concise CineGraph. Encyclopedia of German Cinema. Berghahn Books, 2009.

External links

1924 films
Films of the Weimar Republic
German silent feature films
Films directed by Heinz Schall
German black-and-white films
1920s German films